The Hormosinacea is a superfamily of agglutinated foraminifera in the Textulariida, with a range that extends from the Middle Ordovician, that unites seven families (as indicated) characterized by multilocular tests, (more than one chamber after the proloculus), in a uniserial arrangement.

References

 Alfred R. Loeblich Jr and Helen Tappan,1988. Forminiferal Genera and their Classification. E-book Hormosinacea

Foraminifera superfamilies
Globothalamea